The Student Union of Valdosta State University serves as the social center of VSU and offers students a food court, bookstore, theater, game room, lounge space, and student organization offices.

History
The original University Union, built in 1966, contained the University snack bar, book store, radio station WVVS, mail services, a swimming pool, the offices of the University Union Board, Student Government Association, the yearbook, and newspaper editorial offices.  The school book store was later relocated to a larger structure between S. Walter Martin Hall and the Special Education and Communication Disorders Building on the southern  portion of the campus.  A committee of students, faculty, and staff was formed in 2004 to study the possibility of opening a new Student Union. It was determined that the original facility was inadequate to serve Valdosta State University's growing student enrollment.

In 2008, after years of planning, construction began on a new facility to replace the outdated Union to better accommodate the growing student population of VSU. The construction of the facility was paid for through student fees. The facility opened on January 7, 2010 and a ribbon cutting ceremony was held January 19.

Facility Details
The buildings official size is 
The total cost of construction was $43.2 Million
WTW Architects of Pittsburgh and local firm Ellis, Rickett and Associates Architects and Planners designed the new student union and Skanska USA Building, Inc. served as contractors.

Features
The Student Union features a 305-seat theater with Dolby surround sound, a 10x17' movie screen, and convenience area outside the theater. A two-story,  VSU Bookstore is located inside the Student Union that features a technology shop and text books on the first floor and university merchandise on the second. A game room that offers pool tables, table tennis, board and card games, and video gaming systems is on the bottom floor.  On the second floor is a food court that contains a Which Wich?, Moe's Southwest Grill, Starbucks, and a Chick-fil-A and features indoor and outside seating.  On the third floor is a multi-Purpose Room with seating capacity for 540 persons and lecture seating capacity for 850 persons. The space can also be divided into three smaller rooms to host multiple events.  A glass-walled, two-story rotunda serves as a lounge space with computer kiosks for students. The windows give students a view of Hopper Hall, Converse Hall and Odum Library. The Student Union also features space for student organizations with 24 suites that will accommodate student groups, and 6 meeting rooms.

Photo gallery

References

Valdosta State University campus